Steven "Steve" Reick is an American politician. He is currently a member of the Illinois House of Representatives, representing the 63rd district since January 2017. The district, located in the McHenry area, includes all or parts of Harvard, Marengo, Woodstock, Bull Valley, Wonder Lake, Illinois, Greenwood, McHenry, Fox Lake, Spring Grove, Johnsburg and Lakemoor.

Early life and education
Reick was born and raised in Kankakee, Illinois, graduating from Herscher High School in 1971. Being the first person in his family to attend college, he graduated from University of Illinois in 1975 with a bachelor's degree in Accountancy and went on to earn a Juris Doctor and a master's degree in Accountancy and Taxation from the University of Georgia in 1980.

Career
Reick is a self-employed tax attorney. He began his profession in 1982, when he and his wife moved to Woodstock, Illinois.

Illinois House of Representatives
Reick unsuccessfully ran for State Representative in 2014, losing to incumbent Democrat Jack D. Franks. Reick won 41.46% of the vote to Franks' 58.54%.

Reick ran again in 2016. Reick won the Republican primary and was set to face Franks again. Franks dropped out of the race in May to run for McHenry County Board Chairman, being replaced with John Bartman. Reick won the November 8 general election with 56.5% of the vote. He took office on January 11, 2017.

As of July 2022, Reick is a member of the following Illinois House committees:

 Appropriations - Elementary & Secondary Education Committee (HAPE)
 Elementary & Secondary Education: School Curriculum & Policies Committee (HELM)
 Labor & Commerce Committee (HLBR)
 Revenue & Finance Committee (HREF)
 Wage Policy & Study Subcommittee (HLBR-WAGE)

Electoral history

Personal life
Reick is married to his wife Deb, and together they have three children and four grandchildren. Reick lives in Woodstock, Illinois.

In May 2019, Reick was arrested and charged with driving under the influence.

References

External links
Representative Steven Reick (R) 63rd District at the Illinois General Assembly
100th,101st
Campaign website
Steven Reick, law
Profile at Ballotpedia

Republican Party members of the Illinois House of Representatives
Illinois lawyers
Living people
21st-century American politicians
University of Illinois alumni
University of Georgia alumni
People from Kankakee, Illinois
People from Woodstock, Illinois
Year of birth missing (living people)